Nicholas Routley born 26 June 1947 is an Australian pianist, conductor, accompanist and composer, and the founding director of the Sydney Chamber Choir. Born in England, he was educated in Edinburgh and studied music at St John's College, Cambridge; he emigrated to Australia in 1975 to take up a position at the Department of Music at the University of Sydney. Since 2009 he has resided in the Northern Rivers region of New South Wales (Lismore area) where he is on the teaching staff of the Northern Rivers Conservatorium of Music.

Awards and nominations

ARIA Music Awards
The ARIA Music Awards is an annual awards ceremony that recognises excellence, innovation, and achievement across all genres of Australian music. They commenced in 1987. 

! 
|-
| 1991
| Hermit of Green Light (with Hartley Newnham)
| Best Classical Album
| 
| 
|-

References

External links
Biographical cuttings on Nicholas Routley, conductor, containing one or more cuttings from newspapers or journals at the National Library of Australia

Living people
Australian musicians
1947 births